After You Duchess (French: Après vous, duchesse) is a 1954 French comedy film directed by Robert de Nesle and starring Jean Parédès, Jacqueline Pierreux and Jacques Morel. The film's art direction was by Raymond Nègre.

Synopsis
When she married her snobbish lawyer husband a woman hid her family's modest background from him. Her father, who is in fact a plumber dresses up as a duchess in order to fool him.

Cast
 Jean Parédès as Jeff  
 Jacqueline Pierreux as Suzy 
 Jacques Morel as Armand 
 Luce Aubertin 
 Madeleine Barbulée 
 Charles Bayard 
 Jean-Marie Bon 
 Alain Bouvette 
 Serge Bérat 
 Marcel Charvey 
 Marius Clémenceau 
 Grégoire Gromoff 
 Olivier Hussenot 
 Agnès Laury
 Anne-Marie Mersen 
 Annie Noël 
 Catherine Romane 
 Annie Roudier 
 Linda Sereno 
 Daniel Sorano

References

Bibliography 
 Philippe Rège. Encyclopedia of French Film Directors, Volume 1. Scarecrow Press, 2009.

External links 
 

1954 comedy films
French comedy films
1954 films
1950s French-language films
French black-and-white films
1950s French films